The 1990 United States Senate election in New Hampshire was held on November 6, 1990. Incumbent Republican U.S. Senator Gordon J. Humphrey decided to retire and not run for re-election to a third term. Republican Bob Smith won the open seat, easily defeating the Democratic nominee, former senator John A. Durkin.

Republican primary

Candidates
 Tom Christo, attorney
 Theo deWinter, engineer
 Bob Smith, U.S. Representative from Wolfeboro
 Ewing Smith, candidate for Senate in 1980

Results

Democratic primary

Candidates
 James W. Donchess, Mayor of Nashua
 John A. Durkin, former U.S. Senator
 John Rauh, founder of Americans for Campaign Reform and former CEO of Griffon Corporation

Results

General election

Candidates
 John A. Durkin, former U.S. Senator (Democratic)
 John G. Elsnau (Libertarian)
 Bob Smith, U.S. Representative from Wolfeboro (Republican)

Campaign
The 1990 New Hampshire Senate race garnered national news after John Durkin, previously a senator from New Hampshire in 1975-1980, made a remark that was perceived as a racial slur against the Japanese. Durkin told reporters interviewing him, "If you want a Jap in the United States Senate, then vote for Bob Smith". "Jap" is a term that was frequently used in WWII to describe the Japanese, and was, by 1990, considered racist terminology. The quote destroyed Durkin's campaign and he ended up losing to Smith by a more than 2-to-1 margin, a devastating blow for the ex-Senator.

Results

See also 
 1990 United States Senate elections

References 

United States Senate
New Hampshire
1990